The Orlando metropolitan area, commonly referred to as Greater Orlando, Metro Orlando, Central Florida as well as for U.S. Census purposes as the Orlando–Kissimmee–Sanford, Florida Metropolitan Statistical Area, is a metropolitan area in the central region of the U.S. state of Florida. Its principal cities are Orlando, Kissimmee and Sanford. The U.S. Office of Management and Budget defines it as consisting of the counties of Lake, Orange (including Orlando), Osceola, and Seminole.

According to the 2020 U.S. Census, the population of Greater Orlando is 2,673,376, an increase of nearly 540,000 new residents between 2010 and 2020.

By population, it is the third-largest metropolitan area in Florida, the seventh-largest in the southeastern United States, and the 23rd largest in the United States. The MSA encompasses  of total area (both land and water areas).

The Orlando–Kissimmee–Sanford MSA is further listed by the U.S. Office of Management and Budget as part of the Orlando-Lakeland-Deltona, Florida Combined Statistical Area. This includes the Deltona–Daytona Beach–Ormond Beach Metropolitan Statistical Area (Volusia and Flagler counties) and Lakeland-Winter Haven, FL Metropolitan Statistical Area (Polk County), as well as the micropolitan areas of The Villages (Sumter County) and Wauchula (Hardee County). As of the 2010 census, the Combined Statistical Area population was 3,447,946, with a 2018 estimate at 4,096,575.

Cities

Principal cities

Principal cities (sometimes called primary cities) are defined by the OMB based on population size and employment. In general, a principal city has more non-residents commuting into the city to work than residents commuting out of the city to work.
Orlando, pop. 307,573
Kissimmee, pop. 59,682
Sanford, pop. 53,570

Suburbs with more than 10,000 inhabitants

Alafaya
Altamonte Springs
Apopka
Azalea Park
Buenaventura Lakes
Casselberry
Clermont
Celebration
Conway
Daytona Beach
DeBary
Deland
Deltona
Doctor Phillips
Eustis
Fairview Shores
Four Corners
Goldenrod
Horizon West
Hunter's Creek
Lake Butler
Lake Mary
Lockhart
Longwood
Maitland
Meadow Woods
Mount Dora
Oak Ridge
Ocoee
Ormond Beach
Oviedo
Pine Castle
Pine Hills
Poinciana
Saint Cloud
Southchase
Tavares
University
Wekiva Springs
Winter Garden
Winter Park
Winter Springs

Suburbs with fewer than 10,000 inhabitants

Bay Lake
Bay Hill
Bithlo
Belle Isle
Campbell
Chuluota
Eatonville
Edgewood
Ferndale
Fern Park
Geneva
Gotha
Groveland
Heathrow
Holden Heights
Lake Buena Vista
Lake Hart
Midway
Minneola
Montverde
Mount Plymouth
Oakland
Okahumpka
Orlo Vista
Paradise Heights
Sky Lake
Sorrento
South Apopka
Taft
Tangelo Park
Tangerine
Tildenville
Union Park
Vineland
Wedgefield
Williamsburg
Windermere
Zellwood

Economy

Greater Orlando is one of the most popular tourist destinations in the world thanks to the many theme parks in the area. Famous attractions include Walt Disney World, SeaWorld Orlando and Universal Orlando. Millions of tourists visit these and other attractions every year.

In 2015, the Orlando area attracted 68 million people.

The citrus industry historically dominated the Orlando area economy, but has declined over the past 100 years. The Christmas 1989 impact freeze proved particularly damaging to commercial citrus farming within Greater Orlando.  There are still three major orange juice plants remaining in the area:  Cutrale Citrus Juices in Leesburg; Florida's Natural Growers in Umatilla; and Silver Springs Citrus in Howey-in-the-Hills. Minute Maid maintains a major juice flavoring plant in Apopka.

Other agricultural pursuits, particularly cattle farming, remain important parts of the Central Florida economy, but are now all located on the outer fringes of the metro area. Orlando is also a major food processing center.

Metro Orlando has served as a major military defense and aerospace center since World War II.  The most prominent defense contractor in the area is Lockheed Martin, which operates both a laboratory and a manufacturing facility in Orlando.  Military presence began in the 1940s, with the opening of McCoy Air Force Base and the Orlando Naval Training Center.

McCoy AFB was a major hub of B-52 Stratofortress operations.  McCoy AFB was split between the city and NTC Orlando in 1974, and NTC Orlando closed in the mid-1990s. McCoy AFB is now the location of the Orlando International Airport. Farther north in Sanford, the Orlando Sanford International Airport was originally Naval Air Station Sanford.

Metro Orlando's economy has greatly diversified from tourism, and the area is now considered a primary city for the modeling, simulation and training (MS&T) industry. The University of Central Florida is home to more than 60,000 students, the second largest public university campus by enrollment, and established the UCF College of Medicine in 2006. The Central Florida Research Park is the seventh largest research park in the United States by number of employees, and fourth largest by number of companies. In addition to having a Lockheed Martin branch, it also hosts other major hi-tech companies such as Oracle Corporation, Electronic Arts, and Siemens.

Orlando is targeting the biotechnology and life sciences industries, with major new projects clustering in the Lake Nona Medical City. In addition to the UCF College of Medicine, a VA Hospital, a Sanford-Burnham Institute research center and a Nemours Foundation children's hospital are being constructed.

Industry

Tavistock Group, an investment firm that held  of land immediately southeast of Orlando International Airport began formulating new possibilities for its land use after the decline in tourism to the state. Tavistock decided to use part of the land to establish a bio-sciences cluster.

In 2005, the state of Florida along with Tavistock Group and the University of Central Florida agreed that Tavistock would donate  and $12.5 million (which the state would match for a total of $25 Million) to start the UCF College of Medicine and the Burnett School of Biomedical Sciences. The UCF College of Medicine won approval from the State Board of Governors in 2006. That decision was key to attracting Sanford-Burnham Medical Research Institute to Central Florida. Tavistock then donated another  and $17.5 million to Sanford-Burnham which allowed Sanford-Burnham's East Coast expansion.

In February and March 2007 respectively, Nemours and the United States Department of Veterans Affairs announced Lake Nona as the site of two new hospitals.
Other prospective tenants of the Lake Nona Medical City included MD Anderson Cancer Center Orlando, the University of Florida research center, and Valencia Community College.
It was determined in 2008 from a study done by Arduin, Laffer and Moore Econometrics that the Lake Nona Medical City cluster has in two years reached 80% of the Milken Numbers which were based on the commitments made by the economic development statements. The study then released new projections for the 10-year period which included 30,000 jobs created and a $7.6 billion economic impact.

In January 2020, KPMG completed construction of a $450 million, 55 acre, state-of-the-art training facility in the Lake Nona region of the Greater Orlando area. The site hosts KPMG professionals for training from across the United States, and provides direct shuttles from Orlando International Airport to the training facility. Only the firm's employees are permitted on the grounds.

Transportation

Roads and freeways
Limited-access highways in Greater Orlando include:

 Florida's Turnpike, which heads southeast to the Treasure Coast and South Florida, as well as northwest to connect to Interstate 75 south of Ocala
 Interstate 4, which meets Florida's Turnpike near the Universal Orlando Resort, heads north through the Orlando area to Daytona Beach and southwest to Lakeland and Tampa (the only entirely non-tolled freeway in the area)
 Interstate 95, Crosses Brevard County, and Volusia County running south connecting Treasure Coast & Miami–Fort Lauderdale–Pompano Beach and North connecting Jacksonville–St. Marys–Palatka & Georgia
 The Beachline (Formerly Bee Line Expressway; SR 528), which meets I-4 near SeaWorld and connects to the Orlando International Airport, Space Coast, Cape Canaveral, and the John F. Kennedy Space Center
 The Central Florida GreeneWay (SR 417), which passes around the edge of the eastern half of the area as a beltway, and connects to both Orlando International Airport and Orlando Sanford International Airport
 The East-West Expressway (SR 408), which crosses the area from west (where it connects to Florida's Turnpike) to east (where it connects to Colonial Drive, south of University of Central Florida), passing through downtown Orlando, where it connects to Interstate 4
 The Western Expressway (SR 429), which is partially completed, will eventually serve as a beltway in the western half of the area, connecting to Interstate 4 on both ends from Sanford in the north, through Apopka and Ocoee, and around the west side of Walt Disney World to connect southwest of Kissimmee. 
 The Apopka Bypass (SR 414), is a partial tollway beginning at US 441 Orange Blossom Trail west of Apopka to Maitland Blvd at US 441 south of Apopka. From there, the road continues as "Maitland Blvd", but is a surface road. The spur west of Apopka will eventually run north to begin the "Wekiva Expressway".

The Beachline, Central Florida GreeneWay, East-West Expressway and Western Expressway are all run by the Central Florida Expressway Authority. Florida's Turnpike and portions of tollways not inside Orange County are run by Florida's Turnpike Enterprise, a special district of the Florida Department of Transportation.

Major surface highways include US 17, US 92 and US 441 (which overlap through Orlando as Orange Blossom Trail), US 27 (Claude Pepper Highway), US 192 (Irlo Bronson Highway), SR 50 (Colonial Drive and Cheney Highway), John Young Parkway, and International Drive.

Transit systems
Bus transportation in Orange, Osceola, and Seminole counties is provided by LYNX.  LYNX operates 88 routes as of January 28, 2019. LYNX provides service on local, limited-stop (FastLink), and neighborhood, on-demand circulator routes (NeighborLink).

Lynx had express routes into Clermont and Volusia County, but these were eliminated in 2014 due to the opening of SunRail.  Volusia County is primarily served locally by Votran and Lake County is primarily served locally by LakeXpress.

The SunRail opened for operation in 2014 and the second phase expansion into Osceola County opened on July 30, 2018, with terminal stations at Poinciana and DeBary. Studies are being conducted to extend SunRail to Orlando International Airport (OIA) and Deland.

Rail
SunRail (formerly referred to as Central Florida Commuter Rail) is a commuter rail system in the Greater Orlando, Florida area, linking Poinciana to DeBary through Downtown Orlando. Phase 1 opened in May 2014, and ran between DeBary and Sand Lake Station. Phase II opened in July 2018 and extended to Poinciana through Osceola County with the addition of four new stations.

Church Street Station, once a stop along the Atlantic Coast Line Railroad, has since been redeveloped as an urban night life center, while the station itself will serve as Downtown Orlando's centerpiece SunRail stop.

Amtrak serves stations in the area in Kissimmee, Orlando, Winter Park, Sanford and DeLand.  The Sanford station is the southern terminus for the Auto Train, which transports people and their vehicles, without intermediate station stops, directly to Washington, D.C., via Lorton, Virginia.

The other stations are served by the Silver Meteor and Silver Star, which both travel to New York City.  The difference between the two lines is their paths through the states of South Carolina and North Carolina: Silver Meteor takes a coastal route through Charleston, South Carolina, and Fayetteville, North Carolina, while Silver Star moves inland through Columbia, South Carolina, and Raleigh, North Carolina.

Orlando was eastern terminus of the Amtrak Sunset Limited, until damage to train bridges caused by Hurricane Katrina in 2005 halted service east of New Orleans. , restoration of Amtrak service from New Orleans to Orlando appears to be unlikely.

Orlando is usually named as the initial focus of plans for a Florida High Speed Rail system in which the majority of its residents had supported, but  2.4 billion dollars of federal funding for this new system were refused by Governor Rick Scott of Florida after taking office in January 2011. Scott said that Florida taxpayers would be stuck with paying for expected large cost overruns if the rail system were built.

Orlando will be served by Brightline at Orlando International Airport's new intermodal terminal. Current service runs from Miami to West Palm Beach, with construction to Orlando to begin in March 2019. In addition, an extension of Brightline to Tampa is also proposed.

Airports
The primary major airports of the area are Orlando International Airport, at SR 528 Exit 11/SR 417 Exit 17, and Orlando Sanford International Airport, at SR 417 Exit 49.

Orlando International (MCO) is a focus city of JetBlue and Southwest Airlines.  AirTran Airways was headquartered in Orlando and had a major hub in Orlando but it was merged into Southwest.  JetBlue also has a training facility known as JetBlue University, and is the main training center for JetBlue’s pilots, inflight crew, plus support training for its technical operations and customer service crew. JetBlue also provides general aircraft maintenance and LiveTV installation and maintenance in Orlando.

Orlando Sanford International (SFB) is generally served by charter flights from Europe, though it is also a hub for national small-city carrier Allegiant Air and home to Delta Connection Academy, a pilot training school.

In the Combined Statistical Area, Daytona Beach International Airport  and Leesburg International Airport also serves the area, and is used by many tourists seeking to directly connect to Daytona Beach's many local offerings, such as Daytona Beach Bike Week, Speedweeks and Spring Break.  It is located so its runways cradle Daytona International Speedway, making it convenient for some fans to arrive in Daytona, watch the Daytona 500 or Coke Zero 400, and then return home the same day. Daytona Beach International also serves as the main airport for pilot training at Embry-Riddle Aeronautical University.

Municipal airports in the region include Orlando Executive Airport, Kissimmee Gateway Airport, Ormond Beach Municipal Airport and DeLand Municipal Airport.

Culture

Orlando Chinatown

A Chinatown as of 2002 at 5060 West Colonial Drive (located outside city limits). According to the West Orlando News, the Chinatown features a monument of Sun Yat Sen, a donation from his granddaughter Dr. Lily Sun who unveiled it on the 87th anniversary of his death in 2012, making this the first commercial location to hold such a monument.  In March 2013, a paifang was unveiled at the entrance to the Chinatown plaza, "... helping legitimize the plaza as a center for Chinese commerce." The Chinatown features an eclectic blend of Chinese, Korean, Filipino, Vietnamese and Indian cultures through its numerous pan-Asian businesses.

According to an article by the Orlando Weekly, the location of Orlando's Chinatown was once the Westside Crossing Plaza, which was a Walmart shopping center with a Publix supermarket.  In 2003, the old shopping center was converted to house "... 60 pan-Asian businesses and restaurants."  Financing for the project came from Chinese investors.

The Orlando Sentinel further states that "... by retrofitting the mostly vacant strip center, which includes a former Wal-Mart discount store and Publix supermarket, a group of out-of-state Chinese investors are hoping to draw more than 60 Asian-owned businesses to the site by the end of the year. "  The article states that this is "... creating what the project's developers are calling the region's first Chinatown."  The amenities include bakeries, restaurants, and an Asian grocery store.  So the article further elaborates by saying "... finally, there's a place to buy cuttlefish and black chicken."

Since the project was a success, its report on its conceptualization and development is used as a reference for the real estate and tourism industries.

Media
The primary newspaper of the area is the daily Orlando Sentinel, owned by Tribune Company. It was created as the Orlando Sentinel-Star in 1973 when the Orlando Morning Sentinel and the Orlando Evening Star were merged. It dropped "Star" from the name in 1982. It is also served by various weekly and semi-weekly papers, including Orlando Weekly, The West Orange Times, The East Orlando Sun and the Osceola News-Gazette in Kissimmee.

The extended area is also covered by The Daytona Beach News-Journal and Florida Today.

Greater Orlando makes up a large portion of the "Orlando–Ocala–Daytona Beach, FL" DMA, which ranks No. 19 in size with 1,466,420 households in 2007–08 according to Nielsen Media Research.

All six major broadcast networks are represented in Orlando with their own channels. WESH brought NBC to Orlando when it moved its main operations from Daytona Beach to Eatonville in 1991.

ABC: WFTV (Analog 9, Digital 39)
CBS: WKMG (Analog 6, Digital 58)

NBC: WESH (Analog 2, Digital 11)
FOX: WOFL (Analog 35, Digital 22)

The CW: WKCF (Analog 18, Digital 17)
MNTV: WRBW (Analog 65, Digital 41)

See also

Central Florida
Sports in Orlando, Florida

References

External links
 The Orlando Travel & Visitors Bureau
 The Orlando Regional Chamber of Commerce
 Orlando Welcome Center

 
Lake County, Florida
Orange County, Florida
Osceola County, Florida
Seminole County, Florida
Flagler County, Florida
Sumter County, Florida
Volusia County, Florida
Central Florida